Geoconservation is the practice of recognising, protecting and managing sites and landscapes which have value for their geology or geomorphology. Geoconservation is carried out by a wide range of organisations from local geological societies to government agencies. Typically the conservation of geodiversity at a site or within a landscape takes place alongside that of biodiversity.

In the UK
In the late 1970s, the former Nature Conservancy Council initiated the Geological Conservation Review (GCR), a comprehensive assessment of the key geological and geomorphological sites within England, Scotland and Wales, a task which was largely completed by 1990. Over 3000 sites across Britain were identified and many are now designated as sites of special scientific interest (SSSIs), thus providing them with statutory protection. These geological SSSIs are now managed by the respective country nature conservation bodies; Natural England, NatureScot and Natural Resources Wales. A similar approach has been taken in Northern Ireland with the Earth Science Conservation Review (ESCR).

Many thousands of geosites beneath SSSIs across Great Britain are given protection at a level below that afforded by SSSI status. Originally referred to as regionally important geological sites, the term 'Local Geological Sites' (or LoGS) is now in use for them in England and 'Local Geodiversity Sites' in Scotland, whilst in Wales, they are referred to as 'Regionally Important Geodiversity Sites' (or RIGS). Numerous local groups have been established to protect and conserve these sites, all coming under the 'umbrella organisation', GeoConservationUK.

See also 
Geopark

References 

Nature conservation
Subfields of geology
Geomorphology